The Congo River, formerly also known as the Zaire River, is the second-longest river in Africa, shorter only than the Nile, as well as the second largest river in the world by discharge volume, following only the Amazon.

It is the only major river to cross the Equator twice.

Name
The name Congo/Kongo originates from the Kingdom of Kongo once located on the southern bank of the river. The kingdom in turn was named for the indigenous Bantu Kongo people, known in the 17th century as "Esikongo". South of the Kingdom of Kongo proper lay the similarly named Kakongo kingdom, mentioned in 1535. Abraham Ortelius labeled "Manicongo" as the city at the mouth of the river in his world map of 1564. The tribal names in Kongo possibly derive from a word for a public gathering or tribal assembly. The modern name of the Kongo people or Bakongo was introduced in the early 20th century.

The river was known as Zaire during the 16th and 17th centuries; Congo seems to have replaced Zaire gradually in English usage during the 18th century, and Congo is the preferred English name in 19th-century literature, although references to Zahir or Zaire as the name used by the inhabitants remained common. The Democratic Republic of the Congo and the Republic of the Congo are named after it, as was the previous Republic of the Congo which had gained independence in 1960 from the Belgian Congo. The Republic of Zaire during 1971–1997 was also named after the river's name in French and Portuguese.

Basin and course

The river transports annually 86 million tonnes of suspended sediment to the Atlantic Ocean and an additional 6% of bedload.

The river and its tributaries flow through the Congo rainforest, the second largest rainforest area in the world, after the Amazon rainforest in South America. Because its drainage basin includes areas both north and south of the Equator, its flow is stable, as there is always at least one part of the river experiencing a rainy season.

The sources of the Congo are in the highlands and mountains of the East African Rift, as well as Lake Tanganyika and Lake Mweru, which feed the Lualaba River, which then becomes the Congo below Boyoma Falls. The Chambeshi River in Zambia is generally taken as the source of the Congo in line with the accepted practice worldwide of using the longest tributary, as with the Nile River.

The Congo flows generally toward the northwest from Kisangani just below the Boyoma Falls, then gradually bends southwestward, passing by Mbandaka, joining with the Ubangi River and running into the Pool Malebo (Stanley Pool). Kinshasa (formerly Léopoldville) and Brazzaville are on opposite sides of the river at the Pool, where the river narrows and falls through a number of cataracts in deep canyons (collectively known as the Livingstone Falls), running by Matadi and Boma, and into the sea at Muanda.

Lower Congo constitutes the 'lower' parts of the great river; that is the section of the river from the river mouth at the Atlantic coast to the twin capitals of Brazzaville and Kinshasa. In this section of the river, there are two significant tributaries, both on the left or south side. The Kwilu River originates in the hills near the Angolan border and enters the Congo some 100 km upstream from Matadi. The other being the Inkisi River, that flows in a northerly direction from the Uíge Province in Angola to the confluence with the Congo at Zongo some 80 km downstream from the twin capitals. Because of the vast number of rapids, in particular the Livingstone Falls, this section of the river is not operated continuously by riverboats.

Tributaries

The main river and tributaries are (sorted in order from the mouth heading upstream):

Lower Congo (river mouth to Kinshasa)
Downstream of Kinshasa, from the river mouth at Banana, there are a few major tributaries.
 M'pozo (left)
 Kwilu (left)
 Inkisi (left)
 Djoué (right)
Middle Congo (Kinshasa to the Boyoma Falls)
 Kwa-Kassai (left)
 Fimi
 Lukenie
 Kwango
 Kwilu
 Sankuru
Alima (right)
 Likouala-Mossaka (right) 
 Sangha (right)
 Kadéï (570 km, 41,000 km², 466 m³/s)
 Ubangi (right)
 Mbomou
 Uele
 Tshuapa or Ruki (left)
 Lulonga (left)
 Lopori
 Maringa
 Mongala (right)
 Itimbiri (right)
 Aruwimi (right) 
 Lomami (left)
 Lindi (right)
Upper Congo (Lualaba; upstream from the Boyoma Falls)
Lowa (right)
Ulindi (right)
Elila (right)
Luama (right)
Lukuga (right)
 Luvua (right)
 Luapula (740 km, 173,386 km², 741 m³/s)
 Chambeshi (500 km, 44,427 km², 185 m³/s)

Economic importance

Although the Livingstone Falls prevent access from the sea, nearly the entire Congo above them is readily navigable in sections, especially between Kinshasa and Kisangani. Large river steamers worked the river until quite recently. The Congo River still is a lifeline in a land with few roads or railways. Railways now bypass the three major falls, and much of the trade of Central Africa passes along the river, including copper, palm oil (as kernels), sugar, coffee, and cotton.

Hydroelectric power
The Congo River is the most powerful river in Africa. Opportunities for the Congo River and its tributaries to generate hydropower are therefore enormous. Scientists have calculated that the entire Congo Basin accounts for 13 percent of global hydropower potential. This would provide sufficient power for all of Sub-Saharan Africa's electricity needs.

Currently, there are about 40 hydropower plants in the Congo Basin. The project was launched in the early 1970s, when the first dam was completed. The plan (as originally conceived) called for the construction of five dams that would have had a total generating capacity of 34,500 megawatts (MW). To date only the Inga I and Inga II dams have been built, generating 1,776 MW.

In February 2005, South Africa's state-owned power company, Eskom, announced a proposal to expand generation through improvements and the construction of a new hydroelectric dam. It is feared that these new hydroelectric dams could lead to the extinction of many of the fish species that are native to the river.

Natural history

The current course of the Congo River formed between 1.5 and 2 million years BP, during the Pleistocene. It is likely that during this period many upper tributaries of the Congo were captured from adjacent river basins, including the Uele and upper Ubangi from the Chari system and the Chambeshi River alongside a number of upper Kasai River tributaries from the Zambezi system.

The Congo's formation may have led to the allopatric speciation of the bonobo and the common chimpanzee from their most recent common ancestor. The bonobo is endemic to the humid forests in the region, as are other iconic species like the Allen's swamp monkey, dryas monkey, aquatic genet, okapi, and Congo peafowl.

In terms of aquatic life, the Congo River Basin has a very high species richness and among the highest known densities of endemics. , almost 800 fish species have been recorded from the Congo River Basin (not counting Lake Tanganyika, which is connected but ecologically very different), and large sections remain virtually unstudied. For example, the section in Salonga National Park, which is about the size of Belgium, had still not been sampled at all in 2006. New fish species are scientifically described with some regularity from the Congo River Basin, and many undescribed species are known. 

The Congo has by far the highest diversity of any African river system; in comparison, the next richest are the Niger, Volta and Nile with about 240, 140 and 130 fish species, respectively. Because of the great ecological differences between the regions in the Congo basin —including habitats such as river rapids, deep rivers, swamps, and lakes— it is often divided into multiple ecoregions (instead of treating it as a single ecoregion). Among these ecoregions, the Livingstone Falls cataracts has more than 300 fish species, including approximately 80 endemics while the southwestern part (Kasai River basin) has more than 200 fish species, of which about a quarter are endemic. 

The dominant fish families – at least in parts of the river – are Cyprinidae (carp/cyprinids, such as Labeo simpsoni), Mormyridae (elephant fishes), Alestidae (African tetras), Mochokidae (squeaker catfishes), and Cichlidae (cichlids). Among the natives in the river is the huge, highly carnivorous giant tigerfish. There are also numerous endemic frogs and snails. Several hydroelectric dams are planned on the river, and these may lead to the extinction of many of the endemics.

Several species of turtles and the slender-snouted, Nile and dwarf crocodile are native to the Congo River Basin. African manatees inhabit the lower parts of the river.

History

Pre-colonial history

The entire Congo basin is populated by Bantu peoples, divided into several hundred ethnic groups. Bantu expansion is estimated to have reached the middle Congo by about 500 BC and the upper Congo by the first century AD. Remnants of the aboriginal population displaced by the Bantu migration, Pygmies/Abatwa of the Ubangian phylum, remain in the remote forest areas of the Congo Basin.

The Kingdom of Kongo was formed in the late 14th century from a merging of the kingdoms of Mpemba Kasi and Mbata Kingdom on the left banks of the lower Congo River. Its territorial control along the river remained limited to what corresponds to the modern Kongo Central province. European exploration of the Congo began in 1482 when Portuguese explorer Diogo Cão discovered the river estuary (likely in August 1482), which he marked by a Padrão, or stone pillar (still existing, but only in fragments) erected on Shark Point. Cão sailed up the river for a short distance, establishing contact with the Kingdom of Kongo. The full course of the river remained unknown throughout the early modern period.

The upper Congo basin runs west of the Albertine Rift. Its connection to the Congo was unknown until 1877. The extreme northeast of the Congo basin was reached by the Nilotic expansion at some point between the 15th and 18th centuries, by the ancestors of the Southern Luo speaking Alur people. Francisco de Lacerda followed the Zambezi and reached the uppermost part of the Congo basin (the Kazembe in the upper Luapula basin) in 1796.

The upper Congo River was first reached by the Arab slave trade by the 19th century. Nyangwe was founded as a slavers' outpost around 1860. David Livingstone was the first European to reach Nyangwe in March 1871. Livingstone proposed to prove that the Lualaba connected to the Nile, but on 15 July, he witnessed a massacre of about 400 Africans by Arab slavers in Nyangwe, which experience left him too horrified and shattered to continue his mission to find the sources of the Nile, so he turned back to Lake Tanganyika.

Early European colonization

The Europeans had not reached the central regions of the Congo basin from either the east or west, until Henry Morton Stanley's expedition of 1876–77. At the time one of the last open questions of the European exploration of Africa was whether the Lualaba River fed the Nile (Livingstone's theory), the Congo or even the Niger River. Financed in 1874, Stanley's first trans-Africa exploration started in Zanzibar and reached the Lualaba on October 17, 1876. Overland he reached Nyangwe, the center of a lawless area containing cannibal tribes at which Tippu Tip based his trade in slaves. Stanley managed to hire a force from Tippu Tip to guard him for the next  or so, for 90 days. 

The party left Nyangwe overland through the dense Matimba forest. On November 19 they reached the Lualaba again. Since the going through the forest was so heavy, Tippu Tip turned around with his party on December 28, leaving Stanley on his own, with 143 people, including eight children and 16 women. They had 23 canoes. His first encounter with a local tribe was with the cannibal Wenya. In total Stanley reports 32 unfriendly meetings on the river, some violent, even though he attempted to negotiate a peaceful thoroughfare. But the tribes were wary as their only experience of outsiders was with slave traders.

On January 6, 1877, after , they reached Boyoma Falls (called Stanley Falls for some time after), consisting of seven cataracts spanning  which they had to bypass overland. It took them to February 7 to reach the end of the falls. Here Stanley learned that the river was called Ikuta Yacongo, proving to him that he had reached the Congo and that the Lualaba did not feed the Nile.

From this point, the tribes were no longer cannibals but possessed firearms, apparently as a result of Portuguese influence. Some four weeks and  later he reached Stanley Pool (now Pool Malebo), the site of the present day cities Kinshasa and Brazzaville. On 15 March they started the descent of the falls, which took five months and cost numerous lives. From the Isangile Falls, five falls from the foot, they beached the canoes and Lady Alice and left the river, aiming for the Portuguese outpost of Boma via land. 

On August 3 they reached the hamlet Nsada. From there Stanley sent four men with letters forward to Boma, asking for food for his starving people. On August 7 relief came, being sent by representatives from the Liverpool trading firm Hatton & Cookson. On August 9 they reached Boma, 1,001 days since leaving Zanzibar on November 12, 1874. The party then consisted of 108 people, including three children born during the trip. Most probably (Stanley's own publications give inconsistent figures), he lost 132 people through disease, hunger, drowning, killing and desertion.

Kinshasa was founded as a trading post by Stanley in 1881 and named Léopoldville in honor of Leopold II of Belgium. The Congo Basin was privately claimed by Leopold II as Congo Free State in 1885 where the many Atrocities in the Congo Free State were committed until the region was called the Belgian Congo.

See also

 List of crossings of the Congo River
 2021 Congo River disaster

References

General sources 
 
 Forbath, Peter (1979). The River Congo: The Discovery, Exploration and Exploitation of the World's Most Dramatic River. New York: E. P. Dutton,. .

External links

 The Royal Geography Society's Hidden Journeys project:
 The River Congo Basin
 Audio slideshow: The River Congo: Following in Explorer Sir Henry Morton Stanley's Footsteps – Tim Butcher recounts his trip through the Congo on the route of 19th-century explorer Sir Henry Morgan Stanley.
 Bibliography on Water Resources and International Law Peace Palace Library
 Map of the Congo River basin at Water Resources eAtlas
 The Congo Project, American Museum of Natural History

 

Angola–Democratic Republic of the Congo border
Border rivers
Congolian forests
Democratic Republic of the Congo–Republic of the Congo border
International rivers of Africa
Physiographic sections
Rivers of Angola
Rivers of the Democratic Republic of the Congo
Rivers of the Republic of the Congo